Pierre Doukan (16 October 1927 - 12 October 1995) was a French classical violinist as well as a composer and a pedagogue.

He died on October 12, 1995.

Biography 
Born in Paris, Doukan won the first prizes for violin, chamber music and history of music at the Conservatoire de Paris (1946–1947). In 1955, he won the third prize of the Queen Elisabeth Competition and in 1957 also a prize at the Paganini Competition.

He mainly devoted himself to chamber music and several of his recordings were crowned by the Académie du disque.

In 1969, he became professor of violin at the Conservatoire de Paris at the same time as Michèle Auclair.

In 1993, he became music director of the CNR's department for preparation for orchestral careers.

Doukan composed numerous works for violin and published a violin method in several volumes.

He was married to pianist Thérèse Cochet, with whom he often played in concert and with whom he made several recordings.. Doukan died in Suresnes on 12 October 1995 at age 67.

Bibliography

External links 

 Discography (Discogs) 
 Gabriel Fauré "Violin Sonata No.1 in A Major, Op.13" - Doukan, Cochet (YouTube)

1927 births
1995 deaths
Musicians from Paris
20th-century French male classical violinists
20th-century French composers
Conservatoire de Paris alumni
Academic staff of the Conservatoire de Paris
Prize-winners of the Queen Elisabeth Competition